The Julian calendar is a solar calendar of 365 days in every year with an additional leap day every fourth year (without exception). The Julian calendar is still used in parts of the Eastern Orthodox Church and in parts of Oriental Orthodoxy as well as by the Berbers.

This calendar, proposed by Roman consul Julius Caesar in 46 BC, was a reform of the earlier Roman calendar, a largely lunisolar one. It was designed with the aid of Greek mathematicians and astronomers such as Sosigenes of Alexandria.

The calendar became the predominant calendar in the Roman Empire and subsequently most of the Western world for more than 1,600 years until 1582, when Pope Gregory XIII promulgated a minor modification to reduce the average length of the year from 365.25 days to 365.2425 days and thus corrected the Julian calendar's drift against the solar year. Worldwide adoption of this revised calendar, which became known as the Gregorian calendar, took place over the subsequent centuries, first in Catholic countries and subsequently in Protestant countries of the Western Christian world.

The Julian calendar has two types of years: a normal year of 365 days and a leap year of 366 days. They follow a simple cycle of three normal years and one leap year, giving an average year that is 365.25 days long. That is more than the actual solar year value of approximately 365.2422 days (the current value, which varies), which means the Julian calendar gains a day every 129 years. In other words, the Julian calendar gains 3.1 days every 400 years, while the Gregorian calendar gains 0.1 day over the same time. For any given event during the years from 1901 through 2099, its date according to the Julian calendar is 13 days behind its corresponding Gregorian date (for instance Julian 1 January falls on Gregorian 14 January).

Table of months

History

Motivation
The ordinary year in the previous Roman calendar consisted of 12 months, for a total of 355 days. In addition, a 27- or 28-day intercalary month, the Mensis Intercalaris, was sometimes inserted between February and March. This intercalary month was formed by inserting 22 or 23 days after the first 23 days of February; the last five days of February, which counted down toward the start of March, became the last five days of Intercalaris. The net effect was to add 22 or 23 days to the year, forming an intercalary year of 377 or 378 days. Some say the mensis intercalaris always had 27 days and began on either the first or the second day after the Terminalia (23 February).

According to the later writers Censorinus and Macrobius, the ideal intercalary cycle consisted of ordinary years of 355 days alternating with intercalary years, alternately 377 and 378 days long. In this system, the average Roman year would have had  days over four years, giving it an average drift of one day per year relative to any solstice or equinox. Macrobius describes a further refinement whereby, in one eight-year period within a 24-year cycle, there were only three intercalary years, each of 377 days (thus 11 intercalary years out of 24). This refinement averages the length of the year to 365.25 days over 24 years.

In practice, intercalations did not occur systematically according to any of these ideal systems, but were determined by the pontifices. So far as can be determined from the historical evidence, they were much less regular than these ideal schemes suggest. They usually occurred every second or third year, but were sometimes omitted for much longer, and occasionally occurred in two consecutive years.

If managed correctly this system could have allowed the Roman year to stay roughly aligned to a tropical year. However, since the pontifices were often politicians, and because a Roman magistrate's term of office corresponded with a calendar year, this power was prone to abuse: a pontifex could lengthen a year in which he or one of his political allies was in office, or refuse to lengthen one in which his opponents were in power.

If too many intercalations were omitted, as happened after the Second Punic War and during the Civil Wars, the calendar would drift out of alignment with the tropical year. Moreover, because intercalations were often determined quite late, the average Roman citizen often did not know the date, particularly if he were some distance from the city. For these reasons, the last years of the pre-Julian calendar were later known as "years of confusion". The problems became particularly acute during the years of Julius Caesar's pontificate before the reform, 63–46 BC, when there were only five intercalary months (instead of eight), none of which were during the five Roman years before 46 BC.

Caesar's reform was intended to solve this problem permanently, by creating a calendar that remained aligned to the sun without any human intervention. This proved useful very soon after the new calendar came into effect. Varro used it in 37 BC to fix calendar dates for the start of the four seasons, which would have been impossible only 8 years earlier. A century later, when Pliny dated the winter solstice to 25 December because the sun entered the 8th degree of Capricorn on that date, this stability had become an ordinary fact of life.

Context of the reform 
Although the approximation of  days for the tropical year had been known for a long time, ancient solar calendars had used less precise periods, resulting in gradual misalignment of the calendar with the seasons.

The octaeteris, a cycle of eight lunar years popularised by Cleostratus (and also commonly attributed to Eudoxus) which was used in some early Greek calendars, notably in Athens, is 1.53 days longer than eight mean Julian years. The length of nineteen years in the cycle of Meton was 6,940 days, six hours longer than the mean Julian year. The mean Julian year was the basis of the 76-year cycle devised by Callippus (a student under Eudoxus) to improve the Metonic cycle.

In Persia (Iran) after the reform in the Persian calendar by introduction of the Persian Zoroastrian (i. e. Young Avestan) calendar in 503 BC and afterwards, the first day of the year (1 Farvardin=Nowruz) slipped against the vernal equinox at the rate of approximately one day every four years.

Likewise in the Egyptian calendar, a fixed year of 365 days was in use, drifting by one day against the sun in four years. An unsuccessful attempt to add an extra day every fourth year was made in 238 BC (Decree of Canopus). Caesar probably experienced this "wandering" or "vague" calendar in that country. He landed in the Nile delta in October 48 BC and soon became embroiled in the Ptolemaic dynastic war, especially after Cleopatra managed to be "introduced" to him in Alexandria.

Caesar imposed a peace, and a banquet was held to celebrate the event. Lucan depicted Caesar talking to a wise man called Acoreus during the feast, stating his intention to create a calendar more perfect than that of Eudoxus (Eudoxus was popularly credited with having determined the length of the year to be  days). But the war soon resumed and Caesar was attacked by the Egyptian army for several months until he achieved victory. He then enjoyed a long cruise on the Nile with Cleopatra before leaving the country in June 47 BC.

Caesar returned to Rome in 46 BC and, according to Plutarch, called in the best philosophers and mathematicians of his time to solve the problem of the calendar. Pliny says that Caesar was aided in his reform by the astronomer Sosigenes of Alexandria who is generally considered the principal designer of the reform. Sosigenes may also have been the author of the astronomical almanac published by Caesar to facilitate the reform. Eventually, it was decided to establish a calendar that would be a combination between the old Roman months, the fixed length of the Egyptian calendar, and the  days of Greek astronomy. According to Macrobius, Caesar was assisted in this by a certain Marcus Flavius.

Adoption of the Julian calendar 

Caesar's reform only applied to the Roman calendar. However, in the following decades many of the local civic and provincial calendars of the empire and neighbouring client kingdoms were aligned to the Julian calendar by transforming them into calendars with years of 365 days with an extra day intercalated every four years. The reformed calendars typically retained many features of the unreformed calendars. In many cases, the New Year was not on 1 January, the leap day was not on the traditional bissextile day, the old month names were retained, the lengths of the reformed months did not match the lengths of Julian months, and, even if they did, their first days did not match the first day of the corresponding Julian month. Nevertheless, since the reformed calendars had fixed relationships to each other and to the Julian calendar, the process of converting dates between them became quite straightforward, through the use of conversion tables known as "hemerologia". Several of the reformed calendars are only known through surviving hemerologia.

The three most important of these calendars are the Alexandrian calendar and the Ancient Macedonian calendar─which had two forms: the Syro-Macedonian and the 'Asian' calendars. Other reformed calendars are known from Cappadocia, Cyprus and the cities of (Roman) Syria and Palestine. Most reformed calendars were adopted under Augustus, though the calendar of Nabatea was reformed after the kingdom became the Roman province of Arabia in AD106. There is no evidence that local calendars were aligned to the Julian calendar in the western empire. Unreformed calendars continued to be used in Gaul (the Coligny calendar), Greece, Macedon, the Balkans and parts of Palestine, most notably in Judea.

The Alexandrian calendar adapted the Egyptian calendar by adding a 6th epagomenal day as the last day of the year in every fourth year, falling on 29 August preceding a Julian bissextile day. It was otherwise identical to the Egyptian calendar. The first leap day was in 22 BC, and they occurred every four years from the beginning, even though Roman leap days occurred every three years at this time (see Leap year error). This calendar influenced the structure of several other reformed calendars, such as those of the cities of Gaza and Ascalon in Palestine, Salamis in Cyprus, and the province of Arabia. It was adopted by the Coptic Orthodox Church and remains in use both as the liturgical calendar of the Coptic church and as the civil calendar of Ethiopia.

The Asian calendar was an adaptation of the Ancient Macedonian calendar used in the Roman province of Asia and, with minor variations, in nearby cities and provinces. It is known in detail through the survival of decrees promulgating it issued in 8BC by the proconsul Paullus Fabius Maximus. Since Greek months typically had 29 or 30 days, the extra day of 31-day months was named —the emperor's day—and was the first day of these months. The leap day was a second Sebaste day in the month of Xandikos, i.e., 24 February. This calendar remained in use at least until the middle of the fifth century AD.

The Syro-Macedonian calendar was an adaptation of the Macedonian calendar used in Antioch and other parts of Roman Syria. The months were exactly aligned to the Julian calendar, but they retained their Macedonian names and the year began in Dios (November) until the fifth century, when the start of the year was moved to Gorpiaios (September).

These reformed calendars generally remained in use until the fifth or sixth century. Around that time most of them were replaced as civil calendars by the Julian calendar, but with a year starting in September to reflect the year of the indiction cycle.

The Julian calendar spread beyond the borders of the Roman Empire through its use as the Christian liturgical calendar. When a people or a country converted to Christianity, they generally also adopted the Christian calendar of the church responsible for conversion. Thus, Christian Nubia and Ethiopia adopted the Alexandrian calendar, while Christian Europe adopted the Julian calendar, in either the Catholic or Orthodox variant. Starting in the 16th century, European settlements in the Americas and elsewhere likewise inherited the Julian calendar of the mother country, until they adopted the Gregorian reform. The last country to adopt the Julian calendar was the Ottoman Empire, which used it for financial purposes for some time under the name Rumi calendar and dropped the "escape years" which tied it to Muslim chronology in 1840.

Julian reform

Realignment of the year 

The first step of the reform was to realign the start of the calendar year (1 January) to the tropical year by making 46 BC 445 days long, compensating for the intercalations which had been missed during Caesar's pontificate. This year had already been extended from 355 to 378 days by the insertion of a regular intercalary month in February. When Caesar decreed the reform, probably shortly after his return from the African campaign in late Quintilis (July), he added 67 more days by inserting two extraordinary intercalary months between November and December.

These months are called Intercalaris Prior and Intercalaris Posterior in letters of Cicero written at the time; there is no basis for the statement sometimes seen that they were called "Undecimber" and "Duodecimber", terms that arose in the 18th century over a millennium after the Roman Empire's collapse. Their individual lengths are unknown, as is the position of the Nones and Ides within them.

Because 46 BC was the last of a series of irregular years, this extra-long year was, and is, referred to as the "last year of confusion". The new calendar began operation after the realignment had been completed, in 45 BC.

Months 

The Julian months were formed by adding ten days to a regular pre-Julian Roman year of 355 days, creating a regular Julian year of 365 days. Two extra days were added to January, Sextilis (August) and December, and one extra day was added to April, June, September, and November. February was not changed in ordinary years, and so continued to be the traditional 28 days. Thus, the ordinary (i.e., non-leap year) lengths of all of the months were set by the Julian calendar to the same values they still hold today. (See Sacrobosco's incorrect theory on month lengths (below)  for stories purporting otherwise.)

The Julian reform did not change the method used to account days of the month in the pre-Julian calendar, based on the Kalends, Nones and Ides, nor did it change the positions of these three dates within the months. Macrobius states that the extra days were added immediately before the last day of each month to avoid disturbing the position of the established religious ceremonies relative to the Nones and Ides of the month. However, since Roman dates after the Ides of the month counted down toward the start of the next month, the extra days had the effect of raising the initial value of the count of the day following the Ides in the lengthened months. Thus, in January, Sextilis and December the 14th day of the month became a.d. XIX Kal. instead of a.d. XVII Kal., while in April, June, September and November it became a.d. XVIII Kal.

Romans of the time born after the Ides of a month responded differently to the effect of this change on their birthdays. Mark Antony kept his birthday on 14 January, which changed its date from a.d. XVII Kal. Feb to a.d. XIX Kal. Feb, a date that had previously not existed. Livia kept the date of her birthday unchanged at a.d. III Kal. Feb., which moved it from 28 to 30 January, a day that had previously not existed. Augustus kept his on 23 September, but both the old date (a.d. VIII Kal. Oct.) and the new (a.d. IX Kal. Oct.) were celebrated in some places.

The inserted days were all initially characterised as dies fasti (F – see Roman calendar). The character of a few festival days was changed. In the early Julio-Claudian period a large number of festivals were decreed to celebrate events of dynastic importance, which caused the character of the associated dates to be changed to NP. However, this practice was discontinued around the reign of Claudius, and the practice of characterising days fell into disuse around the end of the first century AD: the Antonine jurist Gaius speaks of dies nefasti as a thing of the past.

Intercalation 
The old intercalary month was abolished. The new leap day was dated as ante diem bis sextum Kalendas Martias ('the sixth doubled day before the Kalends of March'), usually abbreviated as a.d. bis VI Kal. Mart.; hence it is called in English the bissextile day. The year in which it occurred was termed annus bissextus, in English the bissextile year.

There is debate about the exact position of the bissextile day in the early Julian calendar. The earliest direct evidence is a statement of the 2nd century jurist Celsus, who states that there were two-halves of a 48-hour day, and that the intercalated day was the "posterior" half. An inscription from AD 168 states that a.d. V Kal. Mart. was the day after the bissextile day. The 19th century chronologist Ideler argued that Celsus used the term "posterior" in a technical fashion to refer to the earlier of the two days, which requires the inscription to refer to the whole 48-hour day as the bissextile. Some later historians share this view. Others, following Mommsen, take the view that Celsus was using the ordinary Latin (and English) meaning of "posterior". A third view is that neither half of the 48-hour "bis sextum" was originally formally designated as intercalated, but that the need to do so arose as the concept of a 48-hour day became obsolete.

There is no doubt that the bissextile day eventually became the earlier of the two days for most purposes. In 238 Censorinus stated that it was inserted after the Terminalia (23 February) and was followed by the last five days of February, i.e., a.d. VI, V, IV, III and prid. Kal. Mart. (which would be 24 to 28 February in a common year and the 25th to 29th in a leap year). Hence he regarded the bissextum as the first half of the doubled day. All later writers, including Macrobius about 430, Bede in 725, and other medieval computists (calculators of Easter) followed this rule, as does the liturgical calendar of the Roman Catholic Church. However, Celsus' definition continued to be used for legal purposes. It was incorporated into Justinian's Digest, and in the English statute De anno et die bissextili of 1236, which was not formally repealed until 1879.

The effect of the bissextile day on the nundinal cycle is not discussed in the sources. According to Dio Cassius, a leap day was inserted in 41 BC to ensure that the first market day of 40 BC did not fall on 1 January, which implies that the old 8-day cycle was not immediately affected by the Julian reform. However, he also reports that in AD 44, and on some previous occasions, the market day was changed to avoid a conflict with a religious festival. This may indicate that a single nundinal letter was assigned to both halves of the 48-hour bissextile day by this time, so that the Regifugium and the market day might fall on the same date but on different days. In any case, the 8-day nundinal cycle began to be displaced by the 7-day week in the first century AD, and dominical letters began to appear alongside nundinal letters in the fasti.

During the late Middle Ages days in the month came to be numbered in consecutive day order. Consequently, the leap day was considered to be the last day in February in leap years, i.e., 29 February, which is its current position.

Sacrobosco's incorrect theory on month lengths 
The Julian reform set the lengths of the months to their modern values. However, a different explanation for the lengths of Julian months, usually alleged to the 13th century scholar Sacrobosco, but also attested in 12th century works, is still widely repeated, but is certainly wrong.

Allegedly according to Sacrobosco, the month lengths for ordinary years in the Roman Republican calendar were a standard lunar calendar, similar the Greek city calendars. From Ianuarius to December, the month lengths were:

Sacrobosco then thought that Julius Caesar added one day to every month except Februarius, a total of 11 more days to regular months, giving the ordinary Julian year of 365 days. A single leap day could now be added to this extra-short Februarius:

He then said Augustus changed this, by taking one day from Februarius to add it to Sextilis, and then modifying the alternation of the following months, to:

so that the length of Augustus (August) would not be shorter than (and therefore inferior to) the length of Iulius (July), giving us the irregular month lengths which are still in use.

Although plausible and filled with ingenious arithmetical organization, there is abundant evidence disproving this theory.

First, the Fasti Antiates Maiores, a wall painting of a pre-Julian Roman calendar has survived. That pre-Julian calendar confirms the literary accounts that the months were already irregular before Julius Caesar reformed them, with an ordinary year of 355 days (not evenly divisible into Roman weeks), not 354, with month lengths arranged as:

Also, the Julian reform did not change the dates of the Nones and Ides. In particular, the Ides were late (on the 15th rather than 13th) in March, May, July, and October, showing that these months always had 31 days in the Roman calendar, whereas Sacrobosco's theory requires that March, May, and July were originally 30 days long and that the length of October was changed from 29 to 30 days by Caesar and to 31 days by Augustus.

Further, Sacrobosco's theory is explicitly contradicted by the 3rd and 5th century authors Censorinus and Macrobius, and it is inconsistent with seasonal lengths given by Varro, writing in 37 BCE, before Sextilis was renamed for Augustus in 8 BCE, with the 31 day Sextilis given by an Egyptian papyrus from 24 BCE, and with the 28 day Februarius shown in the Fasti Caeretani, which is dated before 12 BCE.

Year length; leap years
The Julian calendar has two types of year: "normal" years of 365 days and "leap" years of 366 days. There is a simple cycle of three "normal" years followed by a leap year and this pattern repeats forever without exception. The Julian year is, therefore, on average 365.25 days long. Consequently, the Julian year drifts over time with respect to the tropical (solar) year (365.24217 days).

Although Greek astronomers had known, at least since Hipparchus, a century before the Julian reform, that the tropical year was slightly shorter than 365.25 days, the calendar did not compensate for this difference. As a result, the calendar year gains about three days every four centuries compared to observed equinox times and the seasons. This discrepancy was largely corrected by the Gregorian reform of 1582. The Gregorian calendar has the same months and month lengths as the Julian calendar, but, in the Gregorian calendar, year numbers evenly divisible by 100 are not leap years, except that those evenly divisible by 400 remain leap years. (Even then, the Gregorian calendar diverges from astronomical observations by one day in 3,030 years.)

The difference in the average length of the year between Julian (365.25 days) and Gregorian (365.2425 days) is 0.002%, making the Julian 10.8 minutes longer. The accumulated effect of this difference over some 1600 years since the basis for calculation of the date of Easter was determined at the First Council of Nicea means for example that, from 29 February Julian (13 March Gregorian) 1900 and until 28 February Julian (13 March Gregorian) 2100, the Julian calendar is 13 days behind the Gregorian calendar; one day after (i.e. on 29 February Julian or 14 March Gregorian), the difference will be 14 days.

Leap year error 

Although the new calendar was much simpler than the pre-Julian calendar, the pontifices initially added a leap day every three years, instead of every four. There are accounts of this in Solinus, Pliny, Ammianus, Suetonius, and Censorinus.

Macrobius gives the following account of the introduction of the Julian calendar:

So, according to Macrobius,
 the year was considered to begin after the Terminalia (23 February),
 the calendar was operated correctly from its introduction on 1 January 45 BC until the beginning of the fourth year (February 42 BC) at which point the priests inserted the first intercalation,
 Caesar's intention was to make the first intercalation at the beginning of the fifth year (February 41 BC),
 the priests made a further eleven intercalations after 42 BC at three-year intervals so that the twelfth intercalation fell in 9 BC,
 had Caesar's intention been followed there would have been intercalations every four years after 41 BC, so that the ninth intercalation would have been in 9 BC,
 after 9 BC, there were twelve years without leap years, so that the leap days Caesar would have had in 5 BC, 1 BC and AD 4 were omitted and
 after AD 4 the calendar was operated as Caesar intended, so that the next leap year was AD 8 and then leap years followed every fourth year thereafter.

Some people have had different ideas as to how the leap years went. The above scheme is that of Scaliger (1583) in the table below. He established that the Augustan reform was instituted in 8 BC. The table below shows for each reconstruction the implied proleptic Julian date for the first day of Caesar's reformed calendar and the first Julian date on which the Roman calendar date matches the Julian calendar after the completion of Augustus' reform.

By the systems of Scaliger, Ideler and Bünting, the leap years prior to the suspension happen to be BC years that are divisible by 3, just as, after leap year resumption, they are the AD years divisible by 4.

Pierre Brind'Amour argued that "only one day was intercalated between 1/1/45 and 1/1/40 (disregarding a momentary 'fiddling' in December of 41) to avoid the nundinum falling on Kal. Ian."

Alexander Jones says that the correct Julian calendar was in use in Egypt in 24 BC, implying that the first day of the reform in both Egypt and Rome, was the Julian date 1 January if 45 BC was a leap year and 2 January if it was not. This necessitates fourteen leap days up to and including AD 8 if 45 BC was a leap year and thirteen if it was not.
In 1999, a papyrus was discovered which gives the dates of astronomical phenomena in 24 BC in both the Egyptian and Roman calendars. From , Egypt had two calendars: the old Egyptian in which every year had 365 days and the new Alexandrian in which every fourth year had 366 days. Up to  the date in both calendars was the same. The dates in the Alexandrian and Julian calendars are in one-to-one correspondence except for the period from 29 August in the year preceding a Julian leap year to the following 24 February. From a comparison of the astronomical data with the Egyptian and Roman dates, Alexander Jones concluded that the Egyptian astronomers (as opposed to travellers from Rome) used the correct Julian calendar.

Due to the confusion about this period, we cannot be sure exactly what day (e.g. Julian day number) any particular Roman date refers to before March of 8 BC, except for those used in Egypt in 24BC which are secured by astronomy.

An inscription has been discovered which orders a new calendar to be used in  the Province of Asia to replace the previous Greek lunar calendar. According to one translation

This is historically correct. It was decreed by the proconsul that the first day of the year in the new calendar shall be Augustus' birthday, a.d. IX Kal. Oct. Every month begins on the ninth day before the kalends. The date of introduction, the day after 14 Peritius, was 1 Dystrus, the next month. The month after that was Xanthicus. Thus Xanthicus began on a.d. IX Kal. Mart., and normally contained 31 days. In leap year, however, it contained an extra "Sebaste day", the Roman leap day, and thus had 32 days. From the lunar nature of the old calendar we can fix the starting date of the new one as 24 January,  in the Julian calendar, which was a leap year. Thus from inception the dates of the reformed Asian calendar are in one-to-one correspondence with the Julian.

Another translation of this inscription is

This would move the starting date back three years to 8 BC, and from the lunar synchronism back to 26 January (Julian). But since the corresponding Roman date in the inscription is 24 January, this must be according to the incorrect calendar which in 8 BC Augustus had ordered to be corrected by the omission of leap days. As the authors of the previous paper point out, with the correct four-year cycle being used in Egypt and the three-year cycle abolished in Rome, it is unlikely that Augustus would have ordered the three-year cycle to be introduced in Asia.

Month names
The Julian reform did not immediately cause the names of any months to be changed. The old intercalary month was abolished and replaced with a single intercalary day at the same point (i.e., five days before the end of February). January continued to be the first month of the year.

Roman
The Romans later renamed months after Julius Caesar and Augustus, renaming Quintilis as "Iulius" (July) in 44 BC and Sextilis as "Augustus" (August) in 8 BC. Quintilis was renamed to honour Caesar because it was the month of his birth. According to a senatus consultum quoted by Macrobius, Sextilis was renamed to honour Augustus because several of the most significant events in his rise to power, culminating in the fall of Alexandria, occurred in that month.

Other months were renamed by other emperors, but apparently none of the later changes survived their deaths. In AD 37, Caligula renamed September as "Germanicus" after his father; in AD 65, Nero renamed April as "Neroneus", May as "Claudius" and June as "Germanicus"; and in AD 84 Domitian renamed September as "Germanicus" and October as "Domitianus". Commodus was unique in renaming all twelve months after his own adopted names (January to December): "Amazonius", "Invictus", "Felix", "Pius", "Lucius", "Aelius", "Aurelius", "Commodus", "Augustus", "Herculeus", "Romanus", and "Exsuperatorius". The emperor Tacitus is said to have ordered that September, the month of his birth and accession, be renamed after him, but the story is doubtful since he did not become emperor before November 275. Similar honorific month names were implemented in many of the provincial calendars that were aligned to the Julian calendar.

Other name changes were proposed but were never implemented. Tiberius rejected a senatorial proposal to rename September as "Tiberius" and October as "Livius", after his mother Livia. Antoninus Pius rejected a senatorial decree renaming September as "Antoninus" and November as "Faustina", after his empress.

Charlemagne
Much more lasting than the ephemeral month names of the post-Augustan Roman emperors were the Old High German names introduced by Charlemagne. According to his biographer, Charlemagne renamed all of the months agriculturally into German. These names were used until the 15th century, over 700 years after his rule, and continued, with some modifications, to see some use as "traditional" month names until the late 18th century. The names (January to December) were: Wintarmanoth ("winter month"), Hornung, Lentzinmanoth ("spring month", "Lent month"), Ostarmanoth ("Easter month"), Wonnemanoth ("joy-month", a corruption of Winnimanoth "pasture-month"), Brachmanoth ("fallow-month"), Heuuimanoth ("hay month"), Aranmanoth ("reaping month"), Witumanoth ("wood month"), Windumemanoth ("vintage month"), Herbistmanoth ("harvest month"), and Heilagmanoth ("holy month").

Eastern Europe
The calendar month names used in western and northern Europe, in Byzantium, and by the Berbers, were derived from the Latin names. However, in eastern Europe older seasonal month names continued to be used into the 19th century, and in some cases are still in use, in many languages, including: Belarusian, Bulgarian, Croatian, Czech, Finnish, Georgian, Lithuanian, Macedonian, Polish, Romanian, Slovene, Ukrainian. When the Ottoman Empire adopted the Julian calendar, in the form of the Rumi calendar, the month names reflected Ottoman tradition.

Year numbering 
The principal method used by the Romans to identify a year for dating purposes was to name it after the two consuls who took office in it, the eponymous period in question being the consular year. Beginning in 153 BC, consuls began to take office on 1 January, thus synchronizing the commencement of the consular and calendar years. The calendar year has begun in January and ended in December since about 450 BC according to Ovid or since about 713 BC according to Macrobius and Plutarch (see Roman calendar). Julius Caesar did not change the beginning of either the consular year or the calendar year. In addition to consular years, the Romans sometimes used the regnal year of the emperor, and by the late 4th century documents were also being dated according to the 15-year cycle of the indiction. In 537, Justinian required that henceforth the date must include the name of the emperor and his regnal year, in addition to the indiction and the consul, while also allowing the use of local eras.

In 309 and 310, and from time to time thereafter, no consuls were appointed. When this happened, the consular date was given a count of years since the last consul (called "post-consular" dating). After 541, only the reigning emperor held the consulate, typically for only one year in his reign, and so post-consular dating became the norm. Similar post-consular dates were also known in the west in the early 6th century.  The system of consular dating, long obsolete, was formally abolished in the law code of Leo VI, issued in 888.

Only rarely did the Romans number the year from the founding of the city (of Rome),  (AUC). This method was used by Roman historians to determine the number of years from one event to another, not to date a year. Different historians had several different dates for the founding. The , an inscription containing an official list of the consuls which was published by Augustus, used an epoch of 752 BC. The epoch used by Varro, 753 BC, has been adopted by modern historians. Indeed, Renaissance editors often added it to the manuscripts that they published, giving the false impression that the Romans numbered their years. However, Censorinus, writing in the 3rd century AD, states that, in his time, the AUC year began with the Parilia, celebrated on 21 April, which was regarded as the actual anniversary of the foundation of Rome.

Many local eras, such as the Era of Actium and the Spanish Era, were adopted for the Julian calendar or its local equivalent in the provinces and cities of the Roman Empire. Some of these were used for a considerable time. Perhaps the best known is the Era of Martyrs, sometimes also called  (after Diocletian), which was associated with the Alexandrian calendar and often used by the Alexandrian Christians to number their Easters during the 4th and 5th centuries, and continues to be used by the Coptic and Ethiopian churches.

In the eastern Mediterranean, the efforts of Christian chronographers such as Annianus of Alexandria to date the Biblical creation of the world led to the introduction of Anno Mundi eras based on this event. The most important of these was the Etos Kosmou, used throughout the Byzantine world from the 10th century and in Russia until 1700. In the west, the kingdoms succeeding the empire initially used indictions and regnal years, alone or in combination. The chronicler Prosper of Aquitaine, in the fifth century, used an era dated from the Passion of Christ, but this era was not widely adopted. Dionysius Exiguus proposed the system of Anno Domini in 525. This era gradually spread through the western Christian world, once the system was adopted by Bede in the eighth century.

The Julian calendar was also used in some Muslim countries. The Rumi calendar, the Julian calendar used in the later years of the Ottoman Empire, adopted an era derived from the lunar AH year equivalent to AD 1840, i.e., the effective Rumi epoch was AD 585. In recent years, some users of the Berber calendar have adopted an era starting in 950 BC, the approximate date that the Libyan pharaoh  came to power in Egypt.

New Year's Day 
The Roman calendar began the year on 1 January, and this remained the start of the year after the Julian reform. However, even after local calendars were aligned to the Julian calendar, they started the new year on different dates. The Alexandrian calendar in Egypt started on 29 August (30 August after an Alexandrian leap year). Several local provincial calendars were aligned to start on the birthday of Augustus, 23 September. The indiction caused the Byzantine year, which used the Julian calendar, to begin on 1 September; this date is still used in the Eastern Orthodox Church for the beginning of the liturgical year. When the Julian calendar was adopted in AD 988 by Vladimir I of Kiev, the year was numbered Anno Mundi 6496, beginning on 1 March, six months after the start of the Byzantine Anno Mundi year with the same number. In 1492 (AM 7000), Ivan III, according to church tradition, realigned the start of the year to 1 September, so that AM 7000 only lasted for six months in Russia, from 1 March to 31 August 1492.

During the Middle Ages 1 January retained the name New Year's Day (or an equivalent name) in all western European countries (affiliated with the Roman Catholic Church), since the medieval calendar continued to display the months from January to December (in twelve columns containing 28 to 31 days each), just as the Romans had. However, most of those countries began their numbered year on 25 December (the Nativity of Jesus), 25 March (the Incarnation of Jesus), or even Easter, as in France (see the Liturgical year article for more details).

In Anglo-Saxon England, the year most commonly began on 25 December, which, as (approximately) the winter solstice, had marked the start of the year in pagan times, though 25 March (the equinox) is occasionally documented in the 11th century. Sometimes the start of the year was reckoned as 24 September, the start of the so-called "western indiction" introduced by Bede. These practices changed after the Norman conquest. From 1087 to 1155 the English year began on 1 January, and from 1155 to 1751 it began on 25 March. In 1752 it was moved back to 1 January. (See Calendar (New Style) Act 1750).

Even before 1752, 1 January was sometimes treated as the start of the new year – for example by Pepys – while the "year starting 25th March was called the Civil or Legal Year". To reduce misunderstandings on the date, it was not uncommon for a date between 1 January and 24 March to be written as "1661/62". This was to explain to the reader that the year was 1661 counting from March and 1662 counting from January as the start of the year. (For more detail, see Dual dating).

Most western European countries shifted the first day of their numbered year to 1 January while they were still using the Julian calendar, before they adopted the Gregorian calendar, many during the 16th century. The following table shows the years in which various countries adopted 1 January as the start of the year. Eastern European countries, with populations showing allegiance to the Orthodox Church, began the year on 1 September from about 988. The Rumi calendar used in the Ottoman Empire began the civil year on 1 March until 1918.

Replacement by the Gregorian calendar 

The Julian calendar has been replaced as the civil calendar by the Gregorian calendar in all countries which officially used it. Turkey switched (for fiscal purposes) on 16 February/1 March 1917. Russia changed on 1/14 February 1918. Greece made the change for civil purposes on 16 February/1 March 1923, but the national day (25 March), was to remain on the old calendar. Most Christian denominations in the west and areas evangelised by western churches have made the change to Gregorian for their liturgical calendars to align with the civil calendar.

A calendar similar to the Julian one, the Alexandrian calendar, is the basis for the Ethiopian calendar, which is still the civil calendar of Ethiopia. Egypt converted from the Alexandrian calendar to Gregorian on 1 Thaut 1592/11 September 1875.

During the changeover between calendars and for some time afterwards, dual dating was used in documents and gave the date according to both systems. In contemporary as well as modern texts that describe events during the period of change, it is customary to clarify to which calendar a given date refers by using an O.S. or N.S. suffix (denoting Old Style, Julian or New Style, Gregorian).

Transition history 

The Julian calendar was in general use in Europe and northern Africa until 1582, when Pope Gregory XIII promulgated the Gregorian calendar. Reform was required because too many leap days were added with respect to the astronomical seasons under the Julian scheme. On average, the astronomical solstices and the equinoxes advance by 10.8 minutes per year against the Julian year. As a result, 21 March (which is the base date for the calculating the date of Easter) gradually moved out of alignment with the March equinox.

While Hipparchus and presumably Sosigenes were aware of the discrepancy, although not of its correct value, it was evidently felt to be of little importance at the time of the Julian reform (46 BC). However, it accumulated significantly over time: the Julian calendar gained a day every 128 years. By 1582, 21 March was ten days out of alignment with the March equinox, the date where it supposedly had been in 325, the year of the Council of Nicaea.

The Gregorian calendar was soon adopted by most Catholic countries (e.g., Spain, Portugal, Poland, most of Italy). Protestant countries followed later, and some countries of eastern Europe even later. In the British Empire (including the American colonies), Wednesday  was followed by Thursday . For 12 years from 1700 Sweden used a modified Julian calendar, and adopted the Gregorian calendar in 1753.

Since the Julian and Gregorian calendars were long used simultaneously, although in different places, calendar dates in the transition period are often ambiguous, unless it is specified which calendar was being used. In some circumstances, double dates might be used, one in each calendar. The notation "Old Style" (O.S.) is sometimes used to indicate a date in the Julian calendar, as opposed to "New Style" (N.S.), which either represents the Julian date with the start of the year as 1 January or a full mapping onto the Gregorian calendar. This notation is used to clarify dates from countries that continued to use the Julian calendar after the Gregorian reform, such as Great Britain, which did not switch to the reformed calendar until 1752, or Russia, which did not switch until 1918 (see Soviet calendar). This is why the Russian Revolution of 7 November 1917 N.S. is known as the October Revolution, because it began on 25 October O.S.

Throughout the long transition period, the Julian calendar has continued to diverge from the Gregorian. This has happened in whole-day steps, as leap days that were dropped in certain centennial years in the Gregorian calendar continued to be present in the Julian calendar. Thus, in the year 1700 the difference increased to 11 days; in 1800, 12; and in 1900, 13. This difference of 13 days will persist until Saturday 28 February 2100 (Julian), i.e. 13 March 2100 (Gregorian), since 2100 is not a Gregorian leap year, but is a Julian leap year; the next day the difference will be of 14 days:  Sunday 29 February (Julian) will be Sunday 14 March (Gregorian); the next day Monday  (Julian) falls on Monday  (Gregorian).

Modern usage

Eastern Orthodox 

Although most Eastern Orthodox countries (most of them in eastern or southeastern Europe) had adopted the Gregorian calendar by 1924, their national churches had not. The "Revised Julian calendar" was endorsed by a synod in Constantinople in May 1923, consisting of a solar part which was and will be identical to the Gregorian calendar until the year 2800, and a lunar part which calculated Easter astronomically at Jerusalem. All Orthodox churches refused to accept the lunar part, so all Orthodox churches continue to celebrate Easter according to the Julian calendar, with the exception of the Finnish Orthodox Church. (The Estonian Orthodox Church was also an exception from 1923 to 1945.)

The solar part of the Revised Julian calendar was accepted by only some Orthodox churches. Those that did accept it, with hope for improved dialogue and negotiations with the western denominations, were the Ecumenical Patriarchate of Constantinople, the Patriarchates of Alexandria, Antioch, the Orthodox Churches of Greece, Cyprus, Romania, Poland (from 1924 to 2014; it is still permitted to use the Revised Julian calendar in parishes that want it), Bulgaria (in 1963), and the Orthodox Church in America (although some OCA parishes are permitted to use the Julian calendar). Thus these churches celebrate the Nativity on the same day that western Christians do, 25 December Gregorian until 2799.

The Orthodox Churches of Jerusalem, Russia, Serbia, Montenegro, Poland (from 15 June 2014), North Macedonia, Georgia, Ukraine, and the Greek Old Calendarists and other groups continue to use the Julian calendar, thus they celebrate the Nativity on 25 December Julian (which is 7 January Gregorian until 2100). The Russian Orthodox Church has some parishes in the West that celebrate the Nativity on 25 December Gregorian until 2799.

Parishes of the Orthodox Church in America Bulgarian Diocese, both before and after the 1976 transfer of that diocese from the Russian Orthodox Church Outside Russia to the Orthodox Church in America, were permitted to use this date. Some Old Calendarist groups which stand in opposition to the state churches of their homelands will use the Great Feast of the Theophany (6 January Julian/19 January Gregorian) as a day for religious processions and the Great Blessing of Waters, to publicise their cause.

Date of Easter 
Most branches of the Eastern Orthodox Church use the Julian calendar for calculating the date of Easter, upon which the timing of all the other moveable feasts depends. Some such churches have adopted the Revised Julian calendar for the observance of fixed feasts, while such Orthodox churches retain the Julian calendar for all purposes.

Syriac Christianity
The Ancient Assyrian Church of the East, an East Syriac rite that is commonly miscategorised under "eastern Orthodox", uses the Julian calendar, where its participants celebrate Christmas on 7 January Gregorian (which is  25 December Julian). The Assyrian Church of the East, the church it split from in 1968 (the replacement of traditional Julian calendar with Gregorian calendar being among the reasons), uses the Gregorian calendar ever since the year of the schism. The Syriac Orthodox Church uses both Julian calendar and Gregorian calendar based on their regions and traditions they adapted.

Oriental Orthodox 
The Oriental Orthodox Churches generally use the local calendar of their homelands. However, when calculating the Nativity Feast, most observe the Julian calendar. This was traditionally for the sake of unity throughout Christendom. In the west, some Oriental Orthodox Churches either use the Gregorian calendar or are permitted to observe the Nativity according to it.

The Armenian Patriarchate of Jerusalem of Armenian Apostolic Orthodox Church uses Julian calendar, while the rest of Armenian Church uses Gregorian calendar. Both celebrate the Nativity as part of the Feast of Theophany according to their respective calendar.

Berbers 
The Julian calendar is still used by the Berbers of the Maghreb in the form of the Berber calendar.

See also 
 Byzantine calendar
 Conversion between Julian and Gregorian calendars
 Julian day
 Julian year (astronomy)
 List of adoption dates of the Gregorian calendar per country
 Mixed-style date
 Old New Year
 Proleptic Gregorian calendar
 Proleptic Julian calendar
 Revised Julian calendar
 Roman timekeeping
 Week

Explanatory footnotes

Citations

General and cited references 
 Bonnie Blackburn and Leofranc Holford-Strevens, The Oxford Companion to the Year, Oxford University Press, reprinted with corrections 2003.

External links 

 Calendars through the ages on WebExhibits.
 Calendar FAQ
 Roman Dates
 The Roman Calendar
 Calendar Converter – converts between several calendars, for example Gregorian, Julian, Mayan, Persian, Hebrew

 
Eastern Orthodox liturgy
Liturgical calendars
Roman calendar